Triphosphane (IUPAC systematic name) or triphosphine is an inorganic compound having the chemical formula . It can be generated from diphosphine but is highly unstable at room temperature:

Samples have been isolated by gas chromatography.

References

External links
IUPAC
CHEBI

Phosphines

Phosphorus hydrides